Saeed Salammat (born 22 October 1963 in Abadan, Iran) is an Iranian football coach and retired player who served as manager at Sanat Naft B. He was also caretaker manager of the junior team in 2013 in the absence of Acácio Casimiro due to a cancer illness.

References

1963 births
Living people
Iranian football managers
Iranian footballers
Association football midfielders
Sanat Naft Abadan F.C. managers